Kyzyl-Özgörüsh is a village in Jalal-Abad Region of Kyrgyzstan. It is part of the Toktogul District. Its population was 2,368 in 2021.

References

Populated places in Jalal-Abad Region